Hell Hath No Fury is the third studio album by hip hop duo Clipse. The album was released on November 28, 2006 in the United States by Re-Up, Star Trak and Jive. Recording sessions for the album took place over a period of several years, and suffered numerous delays prior to release. Production was handled by The Neptunes.

Following the release of their debut studio album, Lord Willin', Clipse began working on the album in late 2003, but were forced to delay development when several artists signed to Arista were dissolved into sister label Jive, as part of a larger merger between Sony and BMG. This resulted in Star Trak moving to Interscope, signing a new distribution deal. Due to contractual requirements, Clipse were forced to remain with Jive. Upon completion of the album, the duo became increasingly frustrated with the label, as Jive was in favor of more pop-oriented acts. Clipse eventually requested a formal release from their contract with the label, which was denied. The duo then sued Jive, eventually reaching a settlement on May 9, 2006.

Hell Hath No Fury landed at Number 14 on the Billboard 200 with 80,000 copies sold in the first week. Two singles were released prior to the album, "Mr. Me Too" and "Wamp Wamp (What It Do)", both of which attained moderate chart success. The album received universal acclaim, and is regarded as one of the best albums of the 2000s.

Background
After releasing Lord Willin' and going on tour, Clipse began recording the album in late 2003. Work on the album was halted in 2004, when Arista Records—their label at the time—was dissolved into its sister label Jive Records, as part of a larger merger between Sony Music Entertainment and BMG. Star Trak Entertainment moved on to Interscope Records, but due to contractual issues, the group was forced to stay with Jive.

While Clipse resumed work on the album, its release was delayed by Jive throughout the rest of 2004 and much of 2005. Additional delays resulted when Clipse sued Jive after the label refused to grant the group a release from its contract. These legal issues would not be resolved until May 2006. Further delays pushed the release date to August 29 then to October 31 and then November 28.

Two singles were released prior to the album. "Mr. Me Too" was released on May 23, 2006 and peaked at Number 65 on Hot R&B/Hip-Hop Songs chart. The song contained a reference to their record label Jive where Pusha T apologized to the fans for the constant album delays and blamed them on the executives at Jive. "Wamp Wamp (What It Do)" was released on October 31 later that year and peaked at Number 96.

Music and lyrics
The music and tone on Hell Hath No Fury is much darker compared to their debut album due to the group's problematic relationship with Jive Records. From an interview with AllHipHop in July 2006, Pusha T said:
  The lyrical focus of the album is primarily drug-dealing, which was what the Clipse were best known for. There were themes of excess, street life, crime, money, and braggadocio employed as well. Pitchfork said:

The album featured a lot of experimental styles of production, compared to the one-way production Lord Willin' had. Pitchfork mentions:

The album had features from Pharrell Williams, Slim Thug, Bilal and Re-up Gang members Ab-Liva and Sandman. Pharrell Williams also provided background vocals for 5 songs in the album.

Critical reception

Hell Hath No Fury was met with widespread critical acclaim. At Metacritic, which assigns a normalized rating out of 100 to reviews from professional publications, the album received an average score of 89 based on 29 reviews, indicating "universal acclaim". 

Allmusic gave it a 5 star rating, and editor Andy Kellman said "Hell Hath No Fury is a lean, furious, cold-blooded album that is vividly to-the-point". Entertainment Weekly gave it an A, stating "Record company nonsense delayed Hell Hath No Fury, the crack-rap duo’s second CD, for eons, but it was worth the wait". The Guardian gave it a score of full 5 stars, claiming "There's not an ounce of fat here". The album was the sixth in the history of XXL magazine to receive the legendary "XXL" rating. Pitchfork gave it a score of 9.1, and told "The long-suffering Pusha and Malice finally issue their troublesome sophomore album; a record packed with a dozen unrelenting tales of desperation and distribution, glamour and gloating that features bleak, spare Neptunes beats. It was worth the wait". The Observer gave the album a perfect score, citing "Hell Hath No Fury is as lyrically kaleidoscopic as it is conceptually monochrome. Track after track flays the central theme, but with such consistently inventive language it seems almost churlish to dwell on its moral bankruptcy". Spin gave it a 4 star score, and noted "On Hell Hath No Fury, Clipse transform cliches into poetry". Rolling Stone also gave the album the same rating and praised the Neptune's production on the album, saying "So why is it one of the best hip-hop albums of the year? For one, nobody gets the beats—dry, hard and evil—that Clipse get from Pharrell Williams and Chad Hugo". Nathan Rabin of The A.V. Club pointed out "In an age where the prevalence of superstars in guest spots threatens to turn solo albums into compilations or mix-tapes, Fury refreshingly represents the undiluted musical vision of Clipse brothers Malice and Pusha T and longtime pal Pharrell". He gave the album a score of B+, which is equivalent to a numerical score of 83 out of 100. Other ratings included a 4 out 5 star rating given by and NME, Q, Vibe, Billboard, Dot music, Paste and Pop Matters. Los Angeles Times gave Hell Hath No Fury a score of 75, responding "There's a cold efficiency in how the Clipse delivers songs built on street-corner cockiness and billfold bluster. It's all shamelessly amoral, but the Clipse wouldn't be such savvy hustlers if they didn't know how to sling with style".

Accolades
The album was ranked first on Prefix magazine's "Best Albums of 2006". Blender magazine placed it number 6 on "The 50 Greatest CDs of 2006". The Sunday Times, which ranked it fourth in its list of the best pop and rock records of 2007, called it a "claustrophobically edgy account of drug-dealing and paranoia, whipped up by The Neptunes into a storm of sonic inventiveness no other hip-hop release in 2007 came close to matching."

Hip Hop Golden Age included the album on its list of the 30 greatest hip hop albums of the 2000s and positioned the album at number 90 in its list of the Top 150 Hip Hop Albums Of The 2000s.

Music website Soul In Stereo placed it as the 4th best rap album of the 2000s. AllMusic placed the album at number 16 in their list of "100 Favorite Albums of The 2000s". Review aggregate site Metacritic placed the album tied at number 13 in their list of The Best Hip Hop Albums of the 21st Century.

Online music magazine Pitchfork ranked the song "Trill" at number six in "The Top 100 Tracks of 2006" and placed the album as the 7th best album of 2006. Pitchfork would later go on to place the album at number 52 on the list of the Top 200 Albums of the 2000s decade, one of the highest rankings for a rap album.

XXL magazine included Hell hath no fury in its article of 50 of the Best Hip-Hop Albums Since 2000. The Guardian placed the album at number 73 in its list of The 100 best albums of the 21st century.

In 2010, online music service Rhapsody called it one of the best "Coke Rap" albums ever. In 2012, Complex named the album one of the classic albums of the last decade and placed the album at number 20 in their list of The 100 Best Albums of the 2000s.

Commercial performance
The album debuted on Number 14 on the Billboard 200 and Number 2 on Top R&B/Hip-Hop albums chart selling 80,000 copies within its first week of availability. As of December 5, 2009 the album has sold 205,000 Copies in the United States.

Track listing
All tracks produced by The Neptunes.

Notes 
 "Momma I'm So Sorry" features background vocals by Pharrell Williams.
 "Dirty Money" features background vocals by Pharrell Williams.
 "Hello New World" features background vocals by Pharrell Williams.
 "Trill" features background vocals by Pharrell Williams.
 "Chinese New Year" features background vocals by Pharrell Williams.

Personnel
Credits for Hell Hath No Fury adapted from Allmusic

Clipse	- Primary Artist
Ab-Liva - Primary Artist
Re-Up Gang - Primary Artist
Slim Thug - Primary Artist
Bilal	- Primary Artist
Rosco P. Coldchain - Primary Artist
Pharrell Williams - Primary Artist, Background Vocals
The Neptunes - Audio Production, Producer
D.L. King - Composer
A.F. Porter - Composer
S. Thomas - Composer
T. Gozney Thornton - Composer
Andrew Coleman - Engineer, Mixing
Hart Gunther - Assistant Engineer, Mixing Assistant
Chris Gehringer - Mastering
Leticia Hilliard - A&R
Mark Pitts - A&R
Jonathan Mannion - Photography
Courtney Walter - Art Direction, Design

Charts

Weekly charts

Year-end charts

References

External links
 

2006 albums
Albums produced by the Neptunes
Clipse albums
Jive Records albums
LaFace Records albums
Star Trak Entertainment albums